Datarails is a New York-based multinational software development company. It offers financial planning and analysis (FP&A) platforms for Microsoft Excel users.

History

Datarails was founded in 2015 by Didi Gurfinkel (CEO), Eyal Cohen (COO) and Oded Har-Tal (CTO). Gurfinkel worked as a GM at Cisco before co-founding Datarails, while Cohen co-founded WalkMe. It is based in New York, USA, and has offices in Israel.

By June 2021, the company had raised US$55 million in Series A funding from sources like Zeev Ventures, Vertex Ventures Israel, Innovation Endeavors, and Vintage Investment Partners. It completed its Series B in March 2022 and raised another $50 million from sources like Qumra Capital, La Maison Partners, and Claltech.

Earth Day

For "Earth Day," Datarails, along with the @State Wide Wildfire Restoration project, planted a new forest - the "Excel Evergreens" in the Washington state area after the 2020 catastrophe. They also added 1,000 more trees for every new customer that joined.

Excel NFTs

In August, 2022, Datarails created the first ever Excel NFTs, as it was the first time that an XLS file (the typical Microsoft Excel file format) was tokenized and placed on a blockchain.
The 5 NFTs each depicted different scenes from the war in Ukraine including pictures of Ukrainian president Volodymyr Zelenskyy and refugees crossing the border. After they were created, the NFTs were put on sale for 1 Ethereum each with the proceeds going to Heart to Heart International, a non-profit dedicated to improving access to healthcare worldwide.

Product and services

The software is geared towards corporate finance teams of small and medium-sized enterprises seeking to improve their financial planning and analysis (FP&A) with Microsoft Excel.

It automates data consolidation and financial reporting and provides workflows, templates, and data visualization that facilitate budgeting, forecasting, scenario modeling and financial analysis. It can be accessed through a Microsoft Excel add-in and a web application, and stores data on the cloud through Microsoft Azure.

Awards and recognition

In December 2021, the company's revenue grew 5x, and the "Globes" magazine ranked Datarails as the number one "Most Promising Israeli Startup." The ranking was done by 63 venture capital firms in Israel.

In February 2022, "Built In" announced that Datarails was named in its "2022 Best Places To Work Awards." The company earned a place on New York City's Best Midsize Companies to Work For and Best Paying Companies.

In April 2022, a group of celebrities who have played accountants and CFOs on renowned TV series participated in a mock competition to become brand ambassadors for Datarails. They include Brian Baumgartner, who played Kevin Malone in the U.S. version of "The Office"; Ewen MacIntosh, who played accountant Keith Bishop in the original U.K. version of "The Office"; George Wendt, who played accountant turned bar patron Norm Peterson in "Cheers"; and Andy Buckley, who played Dundler Mifflin CFO David Wallace in the U.S. version of "The Office."

In October, 2022, Datarails won The Most Promising Startup Award in the category of B2B and Cybersecurity from tech news site The Information.

In November, 2022, Datarails won 3 “Best Employee” awards from Dun’s 100, an economist-based company ranking website published by Dun & Bradstreet. Datarails won 2nd place in “best startup companies promoting diversity and inclusion,” 3rd place in “best startup companies promoting community service policy” and 11th place in “best startup companies to work for with over 100 employees”.

References

Companies of Israel
Financial technology companies
Companies established in the 20th century